The 2018 Australian Men's Curling Championship was held from 7 to 10 June 2018 at the Naseby Curling Club in Naseby, New Zealand. The winners of this championship will represent Australia at the 2018 Pacific-Asia Curling Championships.

At the same time 2018 Australian Women's Curling Championship and 2018 Australian Mixed Curling Championship were held at the Naseby Curling Club.

Teams
The teams are listed as follows:

Triple Knock-out

Stage 1

Stage 2

Stage 3

Play-off

Final standings

See also
 2018 Australian Women's Curling Championship
 2018 Australian Mixed Curling Championship
 2018 Australian Mixed Doubles Curling Championship
 2018 Australian Junior Curling Championship
 2018 Australian Senior Curling Championship

References

Australian Men's
Curling Men's
Australian Men's Curling Championship
Australian Men's Curling
Sport in Otago